Princess O'Hara is a 1935 American comedy film directed by David Burton and starring Jean Parker, Chester Morris and Leon Errol. The story was re-used for the 1943 Abbott and Costello film It Ain't Hay.

Plot

Cast
 Jean Parker as Princess O'Hara  
 Chester Morris as Vic Toledo  
 Leon Errol as Last Card Louie  
 Vince Barnett as Fingers  
 Henry Armetta as Spidoni 
 Verna Hillie as Alberta Whitley  
 Ralph Remley as King O'Hara 
 Dorothy Gray as Maggie O'Hara  
 Anne Howard as Hannah O'Hara  
 Jimmy Fay as Pat O'Hara  
 Phillip Trent as Tad  
 Clara Blandick as Miss Van Cortland  
 Pepi Sinoff as Mrs. Goldberg  
 Tom Dugan as Deadpan

Production
The film's sets were designed by the art director Albert S. D'Agostino.

References

Bibliography
 Nollen, Scott Allen. Abbott and Costello on the Home Front: A Critical Study of the Wartime Films. McFarland, 2009.

External links
 

1935 films
1935 comedy films
American comedy films
Films directed by David Burton
Universal Pictures films
American black-and-white films
1930s English-language films
1930s American films